Genevalor Benbassat & Cie is an asset manager located in Geneva, Switzerland. The firm set up five European feeder funds that invested almost $2 billion into Bernie Madoff's criminal Ponzi scheme.

History
Genevalor was founded in 1983. In 1992 Sonja Kohn introduced Bernie Madoff to Mario Benbassat, founder of Genevalor Benbassat & Cie, and his two sons in New York, as a possible source of new funds for Madoff. Genevalor set up five European feeder funds, including $1.1bn Irish fund Thema International Fund set up by Thema Asset Management, a British Virgin Islands-based company 55 per cent owned by Genevalor, and invested almost $2 billion with Madoff. Thema International paid fees of 1.25 per cent ($13.75m a year) to Genevalor Benbasset & Cie.
 The Wall Street Journal reported in December 2008 that the company was said to be a key player distributing Madoff investments in the Madoff investment scandal.

In December 2010, U.S. court-appointed trustee Irving Picard sued HSBC for $9 billion, accusing it of aiding the Madoff fraud “through the creation, marketing and support of an international network of a dozen feeder funds." The feeder funds named included Genevalor, Benbassat & Cie, which said: “it strongly denies any allegation that it had prior knowledge of the fraud committed by Madoff. This unfounded action causes a significant harm to the investors and to itself.”

In February 2014, Genevalor, Benbassat & Cie on behalf of three funds, who invested with a company owned by Madoff, sued five Lloyd's syndicates under an insurance policy.

In September 2017, Thema agreed to pay $687 million to victims of the Madoff fraud to resolve a lawsuit by Picard.

See also
List of investors in Bernard L. Madoff Securities

References

External links

Investment management companies of Switzerland
Financial services companies established in 1983
Companies based in Geneva
Swiss companies established in 1983
Madoff investment scandal